The Radio and Television Broadcasting Committee of the Democratic People's Republic of Korea, also known as the Korean Central Broadcasting Committee and Korean Central Broadcasting, is a state-owned broadcaster of North Korea.

The committee is under the Cabinet of North Korea, but its personnel is chosen and appointed by the Propaganda and Agitation Department (PAD) of the Workers' Party of Korea. The PAD also assigns tasks to the committee. Hwang Yong-bo is the chairman of the committee.

The committee is base in Chonsung-dong, Moranbong District, Pyongyang. It is a member of the Asia-Pacific Broadcasting Union. The committee has a sports team in the annual Paektusan Prize Games of Civil Servants.

Services
All three major television stations and 200 radio stations are controlled by the committee. Only the Pyongyang FM Broadcasting Station, 
Pyongyang Broadcasting Station, and the Voice of National Salvation under the United Front Department of the Workers' Party of Korea instead. The committee also controls the Korean Central News Agency.

Television
 Korean Central Television

Radio
 Korean Central Broadcasting Station (domestic radio network)
 Third Broadcast (cable radio network used for sensitive public announcements)
 Voice of Korea

Obtaining schedules
Schedules are published in the Rodong Sinmun, Minju Choson, Pyongyang Sinmun and Rimjingang.

Notable anchors
 Ri Chun-hee

See also

 Korea Communications Commission
 Censorship in North Korea
 Media of North Korea
 Telecommunications in North Korea
 Radio jamming in Korea
 Television in North Korea

References

Works cited

Further reading

External links
 

Mass media in Pyongyang
North Korean propaganda organizations
Publicly funded broadcasters
Korean-language television stations
Mass media companies established in 1945
1945 establishments in Korea
Television channels and stations established in 1953
North Korean entities subject to the U.S. Department of the Treasury sanctions